The 2010 Kazakhstan Premier League was the 19th season of the Kazakhstan Premier League, the highest football league competition in Kazakhstan. It started on 22 March 2010 and the regular season ended on 14 August 2010. The playoff rounds began on 22 August 2010 and ended on 6 November 2010. Aktobe are the defending champions, having won their fourth league title in five seasons and their third in a row last season.

This year's competition was completed in two stages. The first stage consisted of all 12 clubs playing against each other twice, once at home and once away. After these matches were completed, the league was split into two halves for the second stage, where each club played every other club in its group twice, once at home and once away. The top six clubs played for the league title while the bottom six clubs played to avoid relegation.

Teams
Kyzylzhar, Kaisar and Kazakhmys were relegated to the Kazakhstan First Division at the end of last season for finishing at the bottom of the league. Because of the league's contraction to twelve clubs for this season, only the First Division champions, Kairat, were promoted in their places.

Okzhetpes finished 11th in last season's competition and took part in a promotion/relegation playoff against the First Division runners-up, Akzhayik, for one spot in this year's competition. Akzhayik won this match 3–2. However, during the off-season, Vostok were expelled from this year's competition due to unpaid debts. Therefore, Okzhetpes will retain their spot in the Premier League.

Stadia and locations

First round

Final league table

Results

First stage
During these matches, each team played each other team twice (once at home and once away).

Second stage
During these matches, each team played every other team in their half of the table twice (once at home and once away).

Top goalscorers 
Source: KFF .

References

External links
 kff.kz 
 lyakhov.kz 
 soccerway.com
 uefa.com

Kazakhstan Premier League seasons
1
Kazakh
Kazakh